In functional analysis, a subset of a real or complex vector space  that has an associated vector bornology  is called bornivorous and a bornivore if it absorbs every element of   

Bornivorous sets play an important role in the definitions of many classes of topological vector spaces, particularly bornological spaces.

Definitions

An absorbing disk in a locally convex space is bornivorous if and only if its Minkowski functional is locally bounded (i.e. maps bounded sets to bounded sets).

Infrabornivorous sets and infrabounded maps

A linear map between two TVSs is called  if it maps Banach disks to bounded disks.  

An absorbing disk in a locally convex space is infrabornivorous if and only if its Minkowski functional is infrabounded.  
A disk in a Hausdorff locally convex space is infrabornivorous if and only if it absorbs all compact disks (that is, if it is "").

Properties

Every bornivorous and infrabornivorous subset of a TVS is absorbing.  In a pseudometrizable TVS, every bornivore is a neighborhood of the origin.  

Two TVS topologies on the same vector space have that same bounded subsets if and only if they have the same bornivores.  

Suppose  is a vector subspace of finite codimension in a locally convex space  and  If  is a barrel (resp. bornivorous barrel, bornivorous disk) in  then there exists a barrel (resp. bornivorous barrel, bornivorous disk)  in  such that

Examples and sufficient conditions

Every neighborhood of the origin in a TVS is bornivorous.  
The convex hull, closed convex hull, and balanced hull of a bornivorous set is again bornivorous.  
The preimage of a bornivore under a bounded linear map is a bornivore.

If  is a TVS in which every bounded subset is contained in a finite dimensional vector subspace, then every absorbing set is a bornivore.

Counter-examples

Let  be  as a vector space over the reals. 
If  is the closed and "filled" triangle with vertices  and  then  is a convex set that is not bornivorous but its balanced hull is bornivorous.

See also

References

Bibliography

  
  
  
  
  
  
  
  
  
   
  
  
  
  

Topological vector spaces